The  (English, "leather-jacket soldier") served in the frontier garrisons of northern New Spain, the Presidios, from the late 16th to the early 19th century. They were mounted and were an exclusive corps in the Spanish Empire. They took their name from the multi-layered deer-skin cloak they wore as protection against Indian arrows. When New Spain's visitador (inspector general) José de Gálvez organized the Portola Expedition, he was accompanied by a party of 25 soldiers, the "finest horsemen in the world, and among these soldiers who best earn their bread from the august monarch whom they serve".

Equipment

 They were armed with a carbine, pair of pistols, bow, dagger, sword, and lance. They also carried a bull-hide shield or a small round metal shield for defense against weapons such as swords, spears, javelins, and arrows. Each soldier had six horses, a foal, and a mule (until 1720 they had 10 horses). Equipment and animals belonged to the soldier personally and they had to pay for them out of their own purse.

Recruitment
These frontier soldiers were recruited from among the Mestizo population, Hispanicized Native Americans, and freed slaves. Most of the officers were Criollos, whereas very few of the enlisted men had this distinction. The  manned the presidios that stretched from Los Adaes, Louisiana, in the East, across Texas, New Mexico, and Arizona, to the Pacific Coast of Alta California in the West. There was no lack of volunteers for the service. Recruitment took place mainly among the local population, accustomed to the local climate, who were expert horsemen, and expert trackers who knew the country.

Assignments

When not on campaign against hostile Indians, the  escorted convoys of travelers or merchandise. They also had to take care of watching the enormous remudas of the presidios from native horse thieves; a fifty man garrison had over 500 horses and mules. This constant vigilance reduced the number of men available for other missions.

Villasur expedition
In August 1720 a detachment of about 40 soldados de cuera, accompanied by indigenous allies, undertook an exploratory incursion into what is now Nebraska. Ambushed by Pawnee and Otoe tribal groups the column was destroyed with only a few horseholders amongst the cuera soldiers escaping. This defeat marked the end of Spanish expansion eastwards into the Great Plains.

Organization
In addition there were two lieutenants (the first lieutenant normally captain by brevet) with a pay of 700 pesos annually. There were also two sergeants with 350 pesos each; six corporals with 300 pesos each; and 69 privates with 290 pesos each. Among the privates were also an armorer, a drummer, and six carabineers.

The  (flying companies) raised in 1767 were used as a mobile reserve, but had the same equipment as the normal companies. The  (light troops) raised in 1778, did not use the leather armor, the shield or the lance, but were otherwise equipped like normal  except their hats were white. The normal strength of the light troops were 19 per company. In Santa Fe they were commanded by a second ensign with 450 pesos annually in pay, and a second sergeant with 320 pesos; light dragoon privates received 216 pesos annually.

Strength

1701

1717

1764
Presidios and their strength in the several provinces:
Texas
Bahía del Espíritu Santo, 51
Adaes, 61
San Sabá, 101
Trinidad, 31
 Bejar, 23
Nuevo México
Santa Fe, 81
El Paso, 50
Nayarit
Nayarit, 43
Nueva Vizcaya
Junta de los Ríos, 50
Janos, 51
Guajoquilla, 51
Coahuila
Rio Grande. 33
San Francisco de Coahuila. 36
Santa Rosa del Sacramento. 52
Nuevo León
San Agustín Ahumada, 27
Sonora
Corodeguachi, 51
Guebavi, 51
Horcasitas, 51
Tubac, 51
Caborca (Altar), 51
Buenavista, 51
California
Loreto, 30
San José del Cabo, 30
Nuevo Santander
Santa Ana Calnargo, 13
Villa de San Fernando, 10
Villa de San Antonio Padilla, 5
Nuestra Señora De Loreto de Burgos, 12
Santa Maria de Llera, 12
San Francisco de Güemes, 8
San Juan Bautista Horcasitas, 11
Dulce Nombre de Jesús Escandan, 9
Soto la Marina, 11
Cinco Señores de Santander, 22
Reinosa, 11
Santa Maria de Aguayo, 1
San Antonio Padilla, 12
Source:

See also
 Army of Arauco

References

Notes

Military history of Mexico
History of Mexico
New Spain
Military history of Spain